Jesse Broadwater (born January 9, 1984), is an athlete from Pennsylvania, United States, who competes in compound archery. His achievements include gold medals at the outdoor, indoor and field World Archery Championships (2012 and 2014), qualifying in first position for the 2013 World Archery Championships, and achieving a career high ranking of 6 in 2013.

References

External links
 

1984 births
Living people
American male archers
World Archery Championships medalists